Ramiro Peña Gauna (born July 18, 1985) is a Mexican professional baseball infielder for the Sultanes de Monterrey in the Mexican Baseball League. He is also signed to the Tomateros de Culiacán of the Mexican Pacific League, where he plays during the winter. He previously played in Major League Baseball (MLB) for the New York Yankees, Atlanta Braves, and San Francisco Giants.

Professional career

New York Yankees
Peña was signed by the New York Yankees out of the Mexican League in 2005. He played for the Tampa Yankees in the Class-A Advanced Florida State League and Trenton Thunder of the Class-AA Eastern League that season and in 2006. He played for Trenton in 2007 and 2008, and was selected to participate in the 2008 All-Star Futures Game.

In 2009, Peña made the Yankees Opening Day roster, beating out Ángel Berroa to be the utility infielder.  He made his major league debut on April 6, 2009, appearing in the game as a pinch runner. On April 9 he got a hit in his first major league at bat, off Chris Ray of the Baltimore Orioles. On April 14 against the Tampa Bay Rays, Pena started his first career game at third base, going 0 for 3 with a walk. On April 30, Peña got his first career run batted in in the bottom of the 8th inning against Justin Speier of the Los Angeles Angels of Anaheim by hitting a double down the right field line.

With the acquisition of Eric Hinske on June 29, 2009, Peña was optioned to the Triple-A Scranton/Wilkes-Barre Yankees of the International League to receive regular at-bats and learn to play in the outfield. Manager Joe Girardi said he expected Peña to be back with the Yankees later in the season. He was recalled to the Yankees on August 7.

Peña was recalled in September, and he hit his first major league home run on September 28, 2009, off of Kansas City Royals pitcher Luke Hochevar at Yankee Stadium.

Peña was a member of the Yankees 2009 World Series championship team which defeated the Philadelphia Phillies in 6 games.

Peña was optioned to Triple-A's Scranton/Wilkes-Barre Yankees to start the 2011 season. On May 6, he was recalled to the majors after Eric Chavez was placed on the disabled list. On July 18, 2011, Peña required an emergency appendectomy.

Ramiro was recalled on July 25, 2012, to replace Alex Rodriguez on the roster after Rodriguez sustained a fractured left pinkie during a game in Seattle. He was optioned back to Triple-A on August 1, 2012, after the Yankees acquired Casey McGehee from the Pittsburgh Pirates. He was designated for assignment on September 1.

Atlanta Braves
After the 2012 season, Peña became a free agent. He signed a one-year contract worth $550,000 with the Atlanta Braves. On June 20, 2013, Peña was placed on the disabled list for right shoulder pain; it was later revealed that he would require right shoulder surgery, ending his season. After the season, Peña signed a one-year deal with the Braves, avoiding arbitration. Peña was designated for assignment by the Braves on November 19, 2014. He was outrighted to the Triple-A Gwinnett Braves on November 27, 2014. Pena refused the assignment and elected for free agency.

San Diego Padres
Peña signed a minor league deal with the San Diego Padres on January 26, 2015. He played for the El Paso Chihuahuas, the Padres' Triple-A affiliate.

San Francisco Giants
On December 13, 2015, Peña signed a minor league deal with the San Francisco Giants. On June 10, 2016, the Giants purchased Peña's contract to replace the injured Kelby Tomlinson. Peña batted .299 in 30 games for the Giants starting games at second base, third base and shortstop. Peña was designated for assignment on July 30, 2016 when Hunter Pence was activated from the DL.

Hiroshima Toyo Carp
On January 30, 2017, Peña signed with the Hiroshima Toyo Carp of Nippon Professional Baseball.

Sultanes de Monterrey
On February 26, 2018, Peña signed with the Sultanes de Monterrey of the Mexican Baseball League.
After the 2018 season, he played for Tomateros de Culiacán of the Mexican Pacific League(LMP).

After the 2019 season, he played for Tomateros of the LMP. He has also played for Mexico in the 2020 Caribbean Series.

In 2020, he did not play a game because of the cancellation of the Mexican League season due to the COVID-19 pandemic.
After the 2020 season, he played for Tomateros of the LMP. He also played for Mexico in the 2021 Caribbean Series.

International career
Peña was selected to play for the Mexico national team in the 2013 World Baseball Classic and 2019 exhibition games against Japan.

References

External links

1985 births
Living people
Atlanta Braves players
Baseball players from Nuevo León
El Paso Chihuahuas players
Hiroshima Toyo Carp players
Major League Baseball second basemen
Major League Baseball shortstops
Major League Baseball third basemen
Major League Baseball players from Mexico
Mexican expatriate baseball players in Japan
Mexican expatriate baseball players in the United States
Mexican League baseball second basemen
Mexican League baseball shortstops
National baseball team players
New York Yankees players
Nippon Professional Baseball third basemen
Sacramento River Cats players
San Francisco Giants players
Scranton/Wilkes-Barre Yankees players
Sportspeople from Monterrey
Sultanes de Monterrey players
Tampa Yankees players
Tomateros de Culiacán players
Trenton Thunder players
2013 World Baseball Classic players
Baseball players at the 2020 Summer Olympics
Olympic baseball players of Mexico